Caco or CACO may refer to:

 Central Asian Cooperation Organization
 Cacos (military group), groups of Haitian armed individuals in the 19th and 20th century 
 Caco-2 cell line
 Casualty Assistance Calls Officer, in Casualty notification
 Qaqun, a Palestinian Arab village depopulated in 1948
 Caco, a common nickname for the Portuguese given name Carlos
 Caco is the nickname of Mušan Topalović, Bosnian war commander